may refer to:

 Ki-Oku, a 1996 album by DJ Krush and Toshinori Kondo
 "Kioku" (Every Little Thing song), a 2002 single by Every Little Thing
 "Kioku", a song by Hayami Kishimoto from the 2003 album Meikyu
 "Kioku", a song by Fumiya Fujii from the 2004 album Cloverfield
 "Kioku" (Misia song), a 2011 single by Misia